Hubert Horatio "Skip" Humphrey III (born June 26, 1942) is an American retired politician who served as attorney general of the state of Minnesota (1983–99) and State Senator (1973–83). Humphrey led the Office of Older Americans as the assistant director at the Consumer Financial Protection Bureau (CFPB).

A Democrat, Humphrey is the son of Vice President Hubert Humphrey and U.S. Senator Muriel Humphrey Brown. He was the Democratic nominee for governor in the hotly contested three-way election of 1998.

Early life
Hubert Horatio Humphrey III was born on June 26, 1942, in Minneapolis, Minnesota.
Humphrey graduated from American University, where he was a member of Alpha Sigma Phi, Beta Chi chapter, and is a graduate of the University of Minnesota Law School.

Political career
Humphrey was elected to the Minnesota Senate in 1972 and served as a state senator from 1973 to 1983. He was elected Minnesota Attorney General in 1982, one of the DFL Party's most popular candidates ever in terms of popular vote. He served in the office for four consecutive terms, from 1983 to 1999.

On January 13, 1978, his father died of bladder cancer at the age of 66.

In 1988, he ran for the same US Senate seat that his father and his mother previously held, but was defeated by incumbent Independent-Republican Senator David Durenberger. After this loss he served as president of the National Association of Attorneys General, and in 1996 he was state chair of President Bill Clinton's reelection campaign.

By 1998 he was again encouraged to run for higher office, and entered the DFL gubernatorial primary, winning handily in a crowded field (which included another scion of an eminent Minnesota political family, Ted Mondale).  In the general election, both Humphrey and Republican candidate Norm Coleman lost to the third-party candidacy of Jesse Ventura in a tumultuous race.
On September 20, his mother died at the age of 86.

Political legacy
Humphrey was an enthusiastic successor of his father's New Deal-inspired political philosophy, and throughout his career he remained devoted to traditional progressive ideals as well as their more modern manifestations: "If you think that being too liberal means raising the minimum wage, advocating health care for everyone, protecting the environment, taking on the tobacco industry, enacting campaign finance reform, and putting more cops on the streets, then guess what? That's what Minnesotans want." One of his most passionately held principles was his opposition to tobacco and its powerful political lobby: in 1999, the World Health Organization awarded him the Director-General's Prize for outstanding global contribution to tobacco control.

Personal life
While a student at American University, Humphrey met Nancy Lee Jeffery, the daughter of a US Navy captain. The two were married while spending the summer of 1963 in Europe. The Humphreys are the parents of three children, including Hubert H. "Buck" Humphrey IV, who ran for Minnesota Secretary of State in 2002, losing by three percentage points to Republican nominee Mary Kiffmeyer.

Humphrey was a senior fellow at the University of Minnesota, where he taught public health policy and law, and was also Senior Vice President at Tunheim Partners, a Minnesota-based communications and public affairs firm. Beginning in 2004, Humphrey served as the president of the Minnesota chapter of the AARP, and later was a member of the Board of Directors of the National AARP. In October 2011, Humphrey was appointed the assistant director of the Office of Older Americans at the Consumer Financial Protection Bureau.

Electoral history

1972

1976

1980

1982

1986

1988

1990

1994

1998

References

External links

|-

|-

1942 births
American people of English descent
American people of Norwegian descent
American United Methodists
American University alumni
Children of vice presidents of the United States
Living people
Minnesota Attorneys General
Democratic Party Minnesota state senators
University of Minnesota Law School alumni
Humphrey family
People of the Consumer Financial Protection Bureau
Candidates in the 1988 United States elections
Candidates in the 1998 United States elections